St Mary and St John Church is a Roman Catholic Parish church in Wolverhampton, West Midlands, England. It was opened in 1855 and designed by Charles Hansom. It is situated on the corner of Snow Hill and Ring Road St Georges. It is Grade II* listed building and has been served by the Pauline Fathers since 2002.

History

Construction
It was built from 1851 in the Gothic Revival style. It was opened in 1855 and the architect was Charles Hansom. He also designed St Osburg's Church, Coventry in 1845 and Erdington Abbey in 1848. After St Mary and St John Church he went on to be behind the construction of St Gregory's Church, Cheltenham in 1854, Plymouth Cathedral in 1856 and Our Lady of the Angels and St Peter in Chains Church, Stoke-on-Trent in 1857.

Developments
From 1879 to 1880, the church was enlarged. Charles Hansom was also responsible for the extension. Twenty-five years later, in 1905, the church was consecrated. The glass in the east end of the church was made by Hardman & Co. In 2002, the administration of the church was handed over to the Pauline Fathers, who have served the parish ever since.

Parish

The Pauline Fathers of the parish also staff two other surrounding parishes. They serve St Teresa of the Infant Jesus Church in Wednesfield and St Patrick's Church in the east of Wolverhampton. St Teresa's Church was originally built in 1933. With the increasing congregation, a new larger church building had to be constructed. On 26 March 1967, the foundation stone was laid and on 7 December 1969, the new church was opened on the corner of Birmingham New Road and Dimmock Street. The old church building became a church hall.

St Patrick's Parish was founded in 1865. The foundation stone of the original church was laid in 1866 and the architect was E. W. Pugin. In the 1960s, with the building of the ring road, the church was demolished and the current site on the corner of Wolverhampton Road and Coronation Road, next to New Cross Hospital was provided by the local council for construction of a new church building. The church was opened in 1972.

St Mary and St Church has three Sunday Masses, they are at 6:30pm on Saturday and 10:00am and 11:30am on Sunday. St Teresa's Church and St Patrick's both have two Sunday Masses each. St Teresa's Church has Sunday Mass at 5:00pm on Saturday and 9:00am on Sunday. St Patrick's Church has its Sunday Masses at 9:30am and 6:30pm.

Exterior

See also
 Roman Catholic Archdiocese of Birmingham

References

External links

 St Mary and St John Parish site
 St Teresa of the Infant Jesus Parish site
 St Patrick's Parish site

Saints Mary and John
Roman Catholic churches in the West Midlands (county)
Grade II* listed churches in the West Midlands (county)
19th-century Roman Catholic church buildings in the United Kingdom
Grade II* listed Roman Catholic churches in England
Gothic Revival church buildings in England
Roman Catholic churches completed in 1880
1851 establishments in England